The men's team tennis event at the 2014 Asian Games took place at the Yeorumul Tennis Courts, Incheon, South Korea from 20 September to 24 September 2014. A total of 19 nations participated in the event. Chinese Taipei were defending champions, but lost in quarterfinals to China.

Schedule
All times are Korea Standard Time (UTC+09:00)

Results

Bracket

Final

Top half

Bottom half

1st round

2nd round

Quarterfinals

Semifinals

Final

References

Results

External links
Official website

Tennis at the 2014 Asian Games